The Catholic Church in Papua New Guinea is part of the worldwide Catholic Church, under the spiritual leadership of the Pope in Rome. Papua New Guinea has approximately two million Catholic adherents, approximately 27% of the country's total population.

The country is divided into nineteen dioceses including four archdioceses.

History

Colonial times
The first Catholic mass was celebrated on the Louisiade Islands, probably Sideia Island, by the chaplain to Torres's expedition in 1606.

The Italian missionary Fr Giovanni Battista Mazzucconi was martyred on Woodlark Island in Milne Bay Province in 1845.

German missionaries of the Society of the Divine Word founded missions on the Sepik River and northern coastal areas from the 1890s. The Prefecture Apostolic of Kaiserwilhelmsland comprised some twelve mission stations along the northern coast. Bishop Louis Couppé had success in East New Britain and acted against the indigenous slave trade.  Five male missionaries and five nuns were massacred in the Baining region of New Britain in 1904, leading to reprisals by the German colonial authorities. The Catholic mission and cathedral at Alexishafen near Madang were destroyed by American bombing in 1943 but the mission was rebuilt after the War.

Many Rabaul Chinese were Catholic. St Theresa's Yang Ching School was founded there in 1924.

In 1995, Pope John Paul II beatified Peter To Rot, a catechist and New Guinea native from New Britain blessed for his martyrdom when in 1945 he refused to embrace polygamy and was killed by occupying Japanese forces.
Many other local Catholics and missionaries suffered death, torture and imprisonment at the hands of the Japanese.

In Papua, the Missionaries of the Sacred Heart began a mission at Yule Island in 1885. Bishop Alain de Boismenu, Vicar Apostolic of Papua from 1908 to 1945, established missionary and charitable activities based on the mission at Yule Island. He was assisted by Filipino catechists. In 1918 he founded an indigenous order of nuns, the Handmaids of the Lord, which is still active. The French mystic and visionary Marie-Thérèse Augustine Noblet (fr), whom de Boismenu exorcised in France in 1921, accompanied him to Papua and assisted at the mission until her death in 1930. Noblet acted as mentor to the first indigenous priest and bishop from Papua New Guinea, Louis Vangeke. Her story made a profound spiritual impression on the Australian poet James McAuley, who visited Yule Island in 1949 and converted to Catholicism.

Fr William Ross accompanied early expeditions of the Leahy brothers to the Highlands and established a mission at Mount Hagen in 1934.

A Marist mission on Bougainville, beginning in 1901, was very successful and the majority of the population became Catholic. Bishop Thomas Wade secured strong support for the mission from Australia and the United States. The Japanese occupation caused major disruption, including the presumed execution of three Australian Marist Brothers by the Japanese. Expansion was rapid after the War, with schools constructed in Chabai and Kieta.

In 1967 the Australian ophthalmologist, Fr Frank Flynn, was appointed as Administrator of the Cathedral and Director of Catholic Health Services in Papua New Guinea. His efforts led to the foundation of a Medical Faculty at the University of Papua New Guinea. Nuns, especially those of the Daughters of Our Lady of the Sacred Heart, were very active in providing local health services. The mission hospitals developed into Catholic Church Health Services, which in 2016 ran five rural hospitals and 244 health facilities.

Since independence
Pope John Paul II visited Papua New Guinea in 1984 and 1995.

Catholics prominent in Papua New Guinea politics include Michael Somare, John Momis (who was a priest for many years) and Bernard Narokobi.

The Divine Word University at Madang was established by Act of Parliament in 1996.

John Ribat, the Archbishop of Port Moresby since 2008, was created the first cardinal from Papua New Guinea in 2016.

Social issues of current concern to the Church include domestic violence and sorcery and climate change.

See also
 List of Saints from Oceania
 List of Catholic dioceses in Papua New Guinea & Solomon Islands

Literature
 Bruno Hagspiel: Along the Mission Trail. III. In New Guinea, Mission Press S.V.D, Techny, Illinois 1926, 270 pp.
 Anton Freitag: Glaubenssaat in Blut und Tränen. Die Missionen der Gesellschaft des Göttlichen Wortes in Asien, Afrika, Ozeanien u. Amerika am Vorabend des Zweiten Weltkrieges, ihre Leiden u. Schicksale in u. nach dem Kriege, dem neuen Missionsfrühling entgegen. Steyler Missionsbuchhandlung: Kaldenkirchen 1948, 446 S.
 Sixta Kasbauer: Die aus grosser Drangsal kommen. Ein Buch von Menschenwegen und Gotteswegen aus den Kriegsjahren der Steyler Neuguinea-Mission, Missionsdruckerei Steyl 1951, 280 S.
 Sister M. Adela, FDNSC: I will give them one heart! A sketch of the life of Archbishop Louis Couppé and the Congregation founded by him – The Daughters of Mary Immaculate of Vunapope, Vunapope, East New Britain, Papua New Guinea 1968, 78 p.
 Joseph Ulbrich (ed.): Pionier auf Neuguinea. Briefe von P. Alfons Schäfer SVD, Steyler Verlagsbuchhandlung, Kaldenkirchen, Rhld. 1960, 147 +  3 Karten (gez. von P. H. Emmerich).
 Mary R. Mennis  - B. Franke: They Came to Matupit. The Story of St. Michaels Church on Matupit Island, Catholic Press: Kokopo, PNG 1972, 120 pp. 
 N. Gash – J. Whittaker: Pictorial History of New Guinea, Jacaranda Press: Milton, Queensland 1975, .
 Hugh Laracy:  Marists and Melanesians. A History of Catholic Missions in the Solomon Islands, Australian National University Press: Canberra 1976, 
 Sister Mary Venard FDNSC: The History of the Daughters of our Lady of the Sacred Heart in Papua New Guinea. Our Lady of the Sacred Heart House, Gordon, Port Moresby, Papua New Guinea 1978, 176 p.
 Mary Rosa MacGinley, Presentation Sisters: Papua New Guinea, 1966-2006. Triple D Books, Wagga Wagga 2008, 251 p.
 Mary R. Mennis: Hagen Saga. The story of Father William Ross, First American Missionary to Papua New Guinea, Institute of PNG Studies, Boroko, Port Moresby 1982, 209 pp. 
 Reiner Jaspers, MSC: A Brief History of the Catholic Church in Papua New Guinea, in: Papers Prepared for the Visit of Pope John Paul II to Papua New Guinea 7–10 May 1984, Port Moresby 1984, 1-6.
 R. Jaspers: The Beginnings of the Catholic Church in Papua New Guinea, in: Papers.. 1984, 31-46.
 George Delbos: The Mustard Seed. From a French Mission to a Papuan Church, 1885-1985, Institute of Papua New Guinea Studies, Port Moresby 1985.  
 Rufus Pech:  The Acts of the Apostles in Papua New Guinea and Solomon Islands, in: B. Schwarz (ed), An Introduction to Ministry in Melanesia, Point Series No. 7, The Melanesian Institute: Goroka, PNG 1985, 17-71.
 John Nilles: They went out to sow. The Beginning of the work of the Catholic Mission in the highlands of PNG. 1933-1943, (Analecta SVD 62), Roma 1987.
 Mary Taylor Huber: The Bishops' Progress. A Historical Ethnography of Catholic Missionary Experience on the Sepik Frontier, Washington - London : Smithsonian Institution Press 1988, 264 pp., . 
 Mary Taylor Huber: The Bishops' Progress: Representations of Missionary Experience on the Sepik Frontier, in: Nancy Lutkehaus (ed.): Sepik Heritage: Tradition and Change in Papua New Guinea, Crawford House Press: Bathurst, NSW (Australia)1990, : pp. 197–211.
 Alphonse Schaefer SVD: Cassowary of the Mountains. The Memoirs of a Pioneer in PNG 1930-1958, (Analecta SVD - 69), Roma 1991, 154 pp.
 Colman Renali: The Roman Catholic Church's Participation in the Ecumenical Movement in Papua New Guinea. A Historical, Contextual, and Pastoral Perspective, Dissertatione apud Pont. Universitatem S. Thomae, die 18, mense II, anno 1991, Rome 1991, 227 pp.
 John Garrett: Footsteps in the Sea. Christianity in Oceania to World War II, Institute of pacific Studies - University of the South Pacific in association with World Council of Churches: Suva and Geneva, 1992, 514 S., 
 Theo Aerts MSC: The Birth of a Religious Movement: A Comparison of Melanesian Cargo Cults and Early Christianity, in Verbum SVD 20, 1979, 323-344; reprinted in: Sedos Bulletin 38 (2006) 239-241; 284-295. 
 Theo Aerts, (ed), The martyrs of Papua New Guinea: 333 missionary lives lost during World War II, University of Papua New Guinea Press, Port Moresby, 1994.
 Theo Aerts, Christianity in Melanesia', University Press of Papua New Guinea, Port Moresby 1998. 256 pp., 
 Paul Steffen: Missionsbeginn in Neuguinea. Die Anfänge der Rheinischen, Neuendettelsauer u. Steyler Missionsarbeit in Neuguinea. (Studia Instituti Missiologici S.V.D. - 61) Steyler Verlag, Nettetal 1995, .
 Divine Word Missionaries - Holy Spirit Sisters: Sent by the Word. 100 years of service by Divine Word Missionaries (1896-1996) and Sisters Servants of the Holy Spirit (1899-1999) on Mainland New Guinea, Production team: Geoff Brumm, Diosnel Centurion, Frank Mihalic, Francesco Sarego and Paul Steffen, Mt. Hagen - Madang 1995, 192 pp., .
 James Waldersee:  'Neither Eagles Nor Saints'. MSC Missions in Oceania 1881-1975, Sydney: Chevalier Press 1995, . 
 Paul B. Steffen: From Church to Mission. Assessment and Perspectives of the Catholic Church in Mainland New Guinea after Its First Hundred Years. In: Steyler Missionswissenschaftliche Institut (ed.), in: Steyler Missionswissenschaftliches Institut (ed.):Divine Word Missionaries in Papua New Guinea, 1896-1996, Festschrift. Steyler Verl., Nettetal 1996, 231-258, . - ibidem in: Verbum SVD 37:1-2 (1996) 231-258.
 Frank Mihalik: Readings in PNG Mission History. A chronicle of SVD and SSpS mission involvement on mainland New Guinea between 1946 and 1996, Divine Word University Press, Madang, PNG 1999, 304 S., .
 Paul B. Steffen, Die katholischen Missionen in Deutsch-Neuguinea, in: H.J. Hiery (ed.), Die deutsche Südsee. Ein Handbuch, 2nd improved and enlarged edition, Schöningh: Paderborn, 2002, 343-383. 
 Sr. Mary Drum MSC: Centenary of 'Martyrdom' at St. Paul's. Remembering the Historical Event and Reflecting Afresh. Archdiocese of Rabaul Office in collaboration with the Centenary Committee, Rabaul, East New Britain, Papua New Guinea 2004, 166 p.
 Ian Breward: A History of the Churches in Australasia, (The Oxford History of Christian Churches), Oxford University Press, Oxford 2001, Reprinted 2008, 474 pp., .
 Ralph M. Wiltgen: The Founding of the Roman Catholic Church in Melanesia and Micronesia 1850-1874, Princeton Theological Monograph Series 84, Pickwick Publications, Eugene, Oregon 2008.
 Alois Greiler SM (ed.): Catholic Beginnings in Oceania. Marist Missionary Perspectives, ATF Press: Hindmarsh, SA, Australia 2009, VII + 240 p. + 14 photo-pages, .
 Ennio Mantovani, SVD : Mission: Collision or Dialogical Encounter? A Chronicle of St. Paul’s Parish, Yobai, Papua New Guinea. Studia Instituti Missiologici SVD 95, Steyler Verlag: Nettetal 2011, 475 p., .
 Diane Langmore, European missionaries in Papua, 1874-1914: a group portrait'', PhD Thesis, ANU, 1981.

External links
 Catholic Church in Papua New Guinea and the Solomon Islands
 Tok Pisin English Dictionary: Catholic Church in Papua New Guinea
 Caritas Papua New Guinea

References

 
Papua New Guinea
Papua New Guinea
Churches in Papua New Guinea